Rallier Island is a small island with a small islet off its north side, lying 0.25 nautical miles (0.5 km) west of the northwest extremity of Booth Island, in the Wilhelm Archipelago. Discovered by the French Antarctic Expedition under Jean-Baptiste Charcot, 1903–05, and named by him for Raymond Rallier du Baty, merchant marine cadet who signed on as seaman on the ship Francais.

Rallier Channel is a narrow channel lying between Rallier Island and the west end of Booth Island, in the Wilhelm Archipelago. Discovered and named by the French Antarctic Expedition under Charcot, 1903–05, in association with Rallier Island.

See also 
 List of Antarctic and sub-Antarctic islands

Islands of the Wilhelm Archipelago